Majdar (also Romanized as Mejdar; also known as  Marjānābād, Mezhdar, Mīzehdar, Mizhdar, and Mojaddad) is a village in Sanjabad-e Shomali Rural District, in the Central District of Kowsar County, Ardabil Province, Iran. At the 2006 census, its population was 332, in 60 families.

References 

Tageo

Towns and villages in Kowsar County